Shawntae Spencer (born February 22, 1982) is a former American football cornerback in the National Football League (NFL). He was drafted by the San Francisco 49ers in the second round (58th overall) in 2004 NFL Draft.

Youth
He played college football at Pittsburgh and graduated from Woodland Hills High School.

Professional career

San Francisco 49ers
Spencer was drafted by the San Francisco 49ers in the second round of the 2004 NFL Draft. He played for the team from 2004 to 2011 and started 72 of 98 games. He recorded 345 tackles, 11 interceptions and 2.5 sacks. He was the 49ers selection for the Ed Block Courage Award in 2009. The 49ers released him on March 15, 2012.

Oakland Raiders
Spencer signed with the Oakland Raiders on March 19, 2012.

References

External links
Oakland Raiders bio
San Francisco 49ers bio

1982 births
Living people
People from Rankin, Pennsylvania
Players of American football from Pennsylvania
American football cornerbacks
Pittsburgh Panthers football players
San Francisco 49ers players
Oakland Raiders players
Ed Block Courage Award recipients